Jean Henri Paul Paelinck (born 4 July 1930) is a Belgian economist and Distinguished Service Professor in the Schar School of Policy and Government at George Mason University. He is known for his work in econometrics, and he coined the term "spatial econometrics" in his address to the Dutch Statistical Association on 2 May 1974.

Education and career
Paelinck earned his Doctor of Law degree maxima cum laude from Belgium's University of Liège in 1953, and his master's' degrees from the same institution the following year. He was a research student in the Department of Applied Economics at Cambridge University from 1958 to 1959, where he worked with Richard Stone. He has taught at the University of Lille, the University of Namur, and Erasmus University Rotterdam.

Honors and awards
In 2014, the Regional Science Association International (RSAI) created the Jean Paelinck Award in Regional Science in honor of Paelinck, who was one of the organization's four founding fellows. Paelinck was named a Knight of the Order of the Netherlands Lion in 1994, and received the RSAI Founder's Medal in 1996.

References

Living people
1930 births
Belgian economists
Econometricians
George Mason University faculty
University of Liège alumni
Academic staff of Erasmus University Rotterdam
Knights of the Order of the Netherlands Lion